St. Andrew's Episcopal Church is a historic Episcopal church located at 2067 Fifth Avenue at 127th Street in the neighborhood of Harlem in Manhattan, New York City. Built in 1872, it was designed by noted New York City architect Henry M. Congdon (1834–1922) in the Gothic Revival style.  It features a 125 foot tall clock tower surmounted by a slate covered spire surrounded by four towerlets.

On March 18, 1980, it was added to the National Register of Historic Places. The church was designated as a city landmark by the New York City Landmarks Preservation Commission in 1967. It is still an active parish in the Episcopal Diocese of New York.

In 2020, it reported 138 members, average attendance of 32, and $192,540 in plate and pledge income.

See also 

 List of New York City Designated Landmarks in Manhattan above 110th Street
 National Register of Historic Places listings in Manhattan above 110th Street
George Roe Van De Water, prominent rector

References

Properties of religious function on the National Register of Historic Places in Manhattan
Gothic Revival church buildings in New York City
Churches completed in 1872
19th-century Episcopal church buildings
Episcopal church buildings in New York City
Churches in Harlem
Harlem
Fifth Avenue